Mnesistega talantodes is a moth in the family Gelechiidae. It was described by Edward Meyrick in 1918. It is found in southern India.

The wingspan is 9–12 mm. The forewings are yellow ochreous with a few scattered dark fuscous scales and a dark purple-fuscous basal patch, which is widest on the costa and sends a more or less suffused costal streak to the posterior fascia. The first discal stigma is cloudy and dark fuscous and there is a slender irregular suffused dark purple-fuscous transverse fascia at three-fourths, as well as an irregular dark purple-fuscous apical spot. The hindwings are grey, more or less hyaline (glass like) between the veins anteriorly, especially in males.

References

Gelechiinae
Moths described in 1918